Odites insons is a moth in the family Depressariidae. It was described by Edward Meyrick in 1912. It is found in the Democratic Republic of the Congo (Katanga) and South Africa (KwaZulu-Natal).

The wingspan is about 18 mm. Adults are wholly ochreous whitish.

References

Moths described in 1912
Odites
Taxa named by Edward Meyrick